This is a list of airlines which have an air operator's certificate issued by the Federal Aviation Administration of the United States.

Note: Destinations in bold indicate primary hubs, those in italic indicate secondary hubs, and those with regular font indicate focus cities. For legacy carriers American, Delta, and United, the most strategic/well connected hubs are shown as Primary Hubs.

Passenger airlines

Mainline

Regional

Commuter

Charter

Cargo airlines

Air ambulances

State-run airlines

See also
 Lists of airlines
 List of airlines of Puerto Rico
 List of airports in the United States
 List of largest airlines in North America
 List of defunct airlines of the United States
 Major airlines of the United States
 Proposed airlines of the United States

References

United States
 
United States aviation-related lists